Léon Avrillaud (3 May 1901 – 8 April 1971) was a French racing cyclist. He rode in the 1925 Tour de France.

References

1901 births
1974 deaths
French male cyclists
Place of birth missing